Dembowski is a lunar impact crater located to the southeast of the Sinus Medii. Its diameter is 26 km. It was named after Italian astronomer Ercole Dembowski. To the east are the  craters Agrippa and Godin, to the southwest is Rhaeticus.

The floor of Dembowski is covered by lava flow that has eradicated the eastern half of the rim, leaving only a slight rise in the surface where the outer wall once lay. The surviving western half of the rim is polygonal in shape, and the ends are broken; forming rises in the surface. The flow of basaltic lava appears to have reached the crater through an irregular channel running in a southern direction from the Sinus Medii.

Satellite craters

By convention these features are identified on lunar maps by placing the letter on the side of the crater midpoint that is closest to Dembowski.

References

External links

Dembowski at The Moon Wiki

Impact craters on the Moon